Willie Molano is a retired Colombian association football player who played professionally in the Major Indoor Soccer League and National Professional Soccer League.

Molano attended Foothill College where he was a 1981 First Team NJCAA All American.  In 1982, the Los Angeles Lazers selected Molano in the second round of the Major Indoor Soccer League draft.  In 1983, the San Diego Sockers selected Molano in the North American Soccer League draft, but Molano did not play for them.  On March 4, 1987, the Lazers traded Molano to the Dallas Sidekick just before the playoffs in exchange for Marcio Leite.  In 1990, he moved to the Tacoma Stars.  In February 1992, Molano played for the Milwaukee Wave of the National Professional Soccer League.  During the summer of 1992, Molano played for the Dallas Rockets of the USISL.  Molano then moved to the Texas Lightning for the 1993–94 USISL indoor season.  In 1994, he finished his career with the Houston Hotshots of the Continental Indoor Soccer League.

In 1996, Molano founded the DFW Tejanos Soccer Club In 2014, DFW Tejanos Soccer Club merged with the Dallas Texans Soccer Club.

External links
 Dallas Sidekicks: Willie Molano
 MISL: Willie Molano

References

Living people
1961 births
Footballers from Bogotá
Colombian footballers
Colombian expatriate footballers
Continental Indoor Soccer League players
Dallas Lightning players
Dallas Rockets players
Dallas Sidekicks (original MISL) players
Foothill Owls men's soccer players
Houston Hotshots players
Los Angeles Lazers players
Major Indoor Soccer League (1978–1992) players
National Professional Soccer League (1984–2001) players
Tacoma Stars players
Milwaukee Wave players
USISL players
Association football forwards
Association football midfielders